Karolis Jukšta (born 2003) is a Lithuanian chess player. He was awarded the title of FIDE Master in 2019.

Chess career
Jukšta won the Lithuanian Chess Championship in 2020 at the age of 17, becoming the second-youngest player to do so.

He qualified for the Chess World Cup 2021, where he was defeated 1½-½ by Arik Braun in the first round.

References

External links

Karolis Jukšta chess games at 365Chess.com

2003 births
Living people
Lithuanian chess players
Chess FIDE Masters